The Mighty Boosh was a 1998 stage show written and performed by Noel Fielding and Julian Barratt, along with Rich Fulcher. It was one of the first incarnations of what eventually became The Mighty Boosh.

Overview
Fielding and Barratt first conceived of The Mighty Boosh whilst working on Stewart Lee's Edinburgh show, King Dong vs. Moby Dick, in which they played a giant penis and a whale respectively.

In 1998, Barratt and Fielding debuted The Mighty Boosh at the Oranje Boom Boom comedy club at De Hems pub in London's Chinatown.  After recruiting fellow comedian Rich Fulcher, (whom the pair had met working on a television series called Unnatural Acts), the trio decided to take the show to the Edinburgh Festival Fringe, where they won the Perrier Best Newcomer Award.

References

The Mighty Boosh